Sun Dan (born September 4, 1986 in Liaoning) is a Chinese rhythmic gymnast who competed in individual and group disciplines.

Career 
Sun started as an individual gymnast and won five medals at the 2004 Asian Rhythmic Gymnastics Championships, two of them gold, and has competed at three World Rhythmic Gymnastics Championships.

She switched to group and represented China at the 2008 Summer Olympics and won a silver medal in the group competition.

References
 
 
 

1986 births
Living people
Chinese rhythmic gymnasts
Gymnasts at the 2008 Summer Olympics
Olympic gymnasts of China
Olympic silver medalists for China
Gymnasts from Liaoning
Olympic medalists in gymnastics
Medalists at the 2008 Summer Olympics
Asian Games medalists in gymnastics
Gymnasts at the 2002 Asian Games
Asian Games gold medalists for China
Medalists at the 2002 Asian Games
21st-century Chinese women